Shinan District is an urban district of Qingdao, Shandong. Shinan is located in coastal hilled terrain, and has a temperate monsoon climate. Common features include moderate temperatures, moist air, abundant rainfall, and four distinct seasons. It is notable for its early 20th-century German architecture, unusual in Chinese cities.

In the mid-19th century the European powers forcibly opened China to foreign trade. Germany acquired the Kiautschou Bay concession from China in 1898, and substantially developed a fishing village they spelled "Tsingtao". The area built by the Germans falls into the part of Qingdao known today as Shinan District.

Shinan is a center for political, business and finance activities, and is home to investment from an increasing number of Fortune 500 companies. To facilitate urban planning, it is divided into a number of areas, including a port and logistics area, tourism area, software/IT area, high-end retail area and financial area.

Shinan is home to the Qingdao International Sailing Centre, a world-class sailing marina constructed for the 2008 Summer Olympics. It hosted the Olympic and Paralympic Sailing competitions. It has also hosted a leg of the Clipper Round the World Yacht Race each year since 2005.

History

After China's defeat in the First Opium War, the country was forcibly opened to foreign trade by a number of treaties collectively referred to as the Unequal Treaties. Following the Treaty of Nanjing (1842), the British established the first treaty ports. Following China's concession to the British Empire, other foreign powers including France, the United States, Portugal, Germany, Japan, and Russia won concessions as well. Foreigners, who were centered in foreign sections of the cities, enjoyed legal extraterritoriality as stipulated in the Unequal Treaties. Foreign clubs, racecourses, and churches were established in major treaty ports. Some of these port areas were directly leased by foreign powers, such as the concessions in China, effectively removing them from the control of local governments.

German presence in Qingdao

In the early 1890s, the German Empire had been considering occupying Jiaozhou Bay ("Jiaozhou" was formerly romanized as Kiaochow, Kiauchau or Kiao-Chau in English and Kiautschou in German) for building its first naval base in East Asia in order to expand into the interior of Shandong. In 1891 the Qing government decided to make Qingdao (commonly spelled "Tsingtao" until well into the 20th century) defensible against naval attack and began to improve the existing fortifications of the town. German naval officials observed and reported on this Chinese activity during a formal survey of Jiaozhou Bay in May 1897. In November 1897, the German Navy seized Jiaozhou Bay under the pretext of ensuring that reparations were paid for the murder of two German Catholic missionaries in the province.

The Kiautschou Bay concession, as it became known, existed from 1898 to 1914. Qingdao was its administrative center. According to Dr. Wilhelm Matzat, of the University of Bonn, "The so-called Marktstrasse (Market street) was nothing more than the old main street of the Chinese village of Tsingtao, and the buildings lining it were the former homes of fishermen and farmers. Having sold their property, they resettled their homes and fields in the villages further east." On gaining control of the area, the Germans outfitted the impoverished fishing village of Tsingtao with wide streets, solid housing areas, government buildings, electrification throughout, a sewer system and a safe drinking water supply. The buildings were built in a European style. The area had the highest density of schools and per capita student enrollment in all of China; primary, secondary and vocational schools were funded by the Imperial German treasury and Protestant and Roman Catholic missions. This area is what later became Shinan District.

During World War I the territory was conquered by a joint Anglo-Japanese task force during the 1914 Siege of Tsingtao and the victorious Allies of World War I awarded the continuation of the lease to the Empire of Japan over the objections of the Republic of China. The territory reverted to Chinese control in 1922.

World War II and subsequent civil war
The Japanese reoccupied Qingdao in January 1938 after the start of the Second Sino-Japanese War. On August 15, 1945, Japan surrendered to Allied forces, officially ending World War II, and forces of the Kuomintang entered the city in September, restoring the government of the Republic of China. During the Chinese Civil War, Qingdao served briefly as a port for the United States Navy.

On June 2, 1949, the Communist-led Red Army entered Qingdao and both the city and Shandong Province have since been under Chinese government control.

Under Mao
Soon after the Communists assumed control, a combination of assertive nationalism and socialist ideology led to the eradication of the Western presence in China, including Western culture and products. "The denunciation of anything Western as 'capitalist,' 'bourgeois' and representative of the 'imperialist world' reached a peak during the ideological extremism of the Korean War (1950–1953) when the final vestiges of the Western economic and cultural presence were eradicated." This took the form of expulsion of foreigners and destruction or defacement of foreign property. An example of this in Shinan District was St. Michael's Cathedral, which was badly damaged during the Cultural Revolution which lasted from 1966 to 1971. During this time St. Michael's Cathedral was defaced by the Red Guards. The crosses topping the twin steeples were removed, with two Red Guards falling to their deaths during the removal.

After Mao
The Chinese government subsequently repudiated the Cultural Revolution. A major document presented at the September 1979 Fourth Plenum of the Eleventh National Party Congress Central Committee, gave a "preliminary assessment" of the entire 30-year period of Communist rule. At the plenum, party Vice Chairman Ye Jianying declared the Cultural Revolution "an appalling catastrophe" and "the most severe setback to [the] socialist cause since [1949]." The Chinese government's condemnation of the Cultural Revolution culminated in the Resolution on Certain Questions in the History of Our Party Since the Founding of the People's Republic of China, adopted by the Sixth Plenary Session of the Eleventh Central Committee of the Communist Party of China. This stated that "Comrade Mao Zedong was a great Marxist and a great proletarian revolutionary, strategist and theorist. It is true that he made gross mistakes during the "cultural revolution", but, if we judge his activities as a whole, his contributions to the Chinese revolution far outweigh his mistakes. His merits are primary and his errors secondary."

Since the 1984 inauguration of China's open-door policy to foreign trade and investment, Qingdao has developed quickly as a modern port city. In 1986, Qingdao became one of five cities specifically designated in the state plan and granted with provincial level authority over economic administration. In 1994, Qingdao was elevated to one of China's 15 sub-provincial cities.

Geography and climate
It is located in coastal hilly terrain, and has a temperate monsoon climate. Common features include moderate temperatures, moist air, abundant rainfall, and four distinct seasons. In the spring, temperatures tend to rise slowly, a month later than inland. Summers are warm and rainy, winters are windy and dip below freezing.

Administrative divisions 

Demographics 

Economy
Shinan "is situated in Qingdao's downtown area; it is a centre for political, business and finance activities, and is home to investment from an increasing number of 'Fortune 500' companies." To facilitate urban planning, it is divided into a number of areas, including a port and logistics area, tourism area, software/IT area, high-end retail area and financial area.

Foreign investment
Shinan's foreign direct investment utilization reached US$188 million in 2006, a 45% increase over 2005. By the end of 2006, 2,282 foreign companies had facilities in Shinan; 55 of which had invested over US$10 million each, and over 30 being counted in the world's top 500 companies.

According to a report by global consulting firm KPMG, "Ranked according to size of investment, the top five industry sectors for foreign investment in Shinan in 2006 were real estate, professional services (accounting, legal services), logistics, wholesaling, retailing and restaurant and tourism; more than half of this amount was invested in real estate."

Culture

Economic reform has paved the way for rapid development of cultural undertakings in Shinan District, which strives to maintain its coastal culture in the face of major urban development by holding ocean-themed festivals such as "Marine Day" and "Sea of Love". The 2008 Olympics provided an unprecedented level of cultural exchange in the city.

Major outdoor cultural facilities in Shinan include May Fourth Square (pictured at left), Music Square, Ba Da Guan Square, Tanzan Square, Lao She parks, Huiquan Square, and Station Square.

Theaters include Red Star Cinema, Chinese Cinema, and Huiquan Theater. Conference/exhibition facilities include Qingdao People's Hall, Qingdao Stadium, and the Qingdao Municipal Conference Center.

Tourism
Over three-quarters of Qingdao's tourist resorts are located in Shinan, due to its scenic coast and beaches.

Attractions in Shinan

Zhanqiao Pier
Xiao Qingdao
, Qingdao Folk Museum
Ba Da Guan (Eight Great Passes), an area of Shinan with surviving German and Japanese architecture
Lu Xun Park, named after Lu Xun, a famous modern Chinese writer and critic, who lived and taught in the 1930s
, named after the style name 'Zhongshan' of Sun Zhongshan, a famous modern Chinese politician
Xiao Yu Hill (Little Fish Hill)
Qingdao Botanical Garden
The twin-spired, neo-Romanesque St. Michael's Cathedral, completed in 1934 by German missionaries
Huashi Villa, a stone mansion in the Ba Da Guan neighborhood built by a Russian aristocrat
Qingdao Aquarium
Jiaozhou Governor's Hall, office building of former German governors [Gouverneurspalast] and former municipal government
Guest House, a classic German Castle
Signal Hill

 (团岛山)


Qingdao Bathing Beaches, 6 well-known beaches with complete facilities.

Sport
The Qingdao International Sailing Centre is a sailing marina located on the former site of the Beihai Shipyard on Shinan's Fushan Bay. It was constructed for the 2008 Summer Olympics. It hosted the Olympic and Paralympic Sailing competitions. Wind conditions vary greatly from very light winds to greater than 15 knots. During the Olympic competitions, fog was also an occasional factor. The sailing centre is now open to the public.

Since 2005, Shinan has hosted a leg of the Clipper Round the World Yacht Race. In May 2008, the Qingdao International Sailing Centre hosted the 2008 IFDS Qingdao International Regatta  In the first quarter of 2009, the sailing centre hosted sailors from eight teams of the 2008–09 Volvo Ocean Race.

Health, welfare, and education
Shinan District has 3,084 beds and 4,560 healthcare personnel in 18 hospitals and health centers as of March 2007. In 2009, the Shinan District Red Cross Society was listed as one of the top 10 county-level Red Cross organizations in the People's Republic of China.

In 2008, a training base for teacher development was founded in Shinan District, the first of its kind in the nation.

References

External links 
 Shinan District People's Government (in Chinese)

Geography of Qingdao
County-level divisions of Shandong
Districts of China